Rodolfo Castro (born May 21, 1999) is a Dominican professional baseball second baseman for the Pittsburgh Pirates of Major League Baseball (MLB).

Career

Minor league career
Castro signed with the Pittsburgh Pirates as an international free agent in 2015. He made his professional debut in 2016 with the Dominican Summer League Pirates, batting .271 with two home runs and 29 RBIs over 56 games. In 2017, he played with the Gulf Coast League Pirates, slashing .277/.344/.479 with six home runs and 32 RBIs, and in 2018, he played for the West Virginia Power, hitting .231 with 12 home runs and 50 RBIs. Castro split the 2019 season with both the Greensboro Grasshoppers (with whom he was named a South Atlantic League All-Star) and the Bradenton Marauders, slashing a combined .242/.298/.456 with 19 home runs and 73 RBIs.

Pittsburgh Pirates
On November 20, 2020, Castro was added to the 40-man roster. He was promoted to the major leagues for the first time on April 21, 2021. He made his MLB debut that day as the starting third baseman in the second game of a doubleheader against the Detroit Tigers. He was optioned to the Altoona Curve in mid-July, but was recalled shortly after the Pirates traded Adam Frazier, with Castro being Frazier's replacement at second base.

On July 28, 2021, Castro hit two home runs against the Milwaukee Brewers. These were both his fourth and fifth major league home runs and his fourth and fifth major league hits, making him the first major league player since at least 1901 whose first five major league hits were all home runs.

References

External links

1999 births
Living people
Bradenton Marauders players
Dominican Summer League Pirates players
Gigantes de Carolina players
Dominican Republic expatriate baseball players in Puerto Rico
Greensboro Grasshoppers players
Gulf Coast Pirates players
Major League Baseball infielders
Major League Baseball players from the Dominican Republic
Pittsburgh Pirates players
West Virginia Power players
Altoona Curve players
Dominican Republic expatriate baseball players in the United States
People from Elías Piña Province
Indianapolis Indians players